The Cliff Bridge, previously known as the Spa Bridge, is a footbridge in Scarborough, North Yorkshire, England. Spanning the valley from St Nicholas Cliff to The Spa, it was completed in 1827 and is a Grade II listed building.

It is a rare example of a multiple-span cast iron bridge.

History
With the discovery of spa waters in Scarborough in the 17th century, the southern part of the town began to receive thousands of visitors. However, although it was easy to access the Spa from the South Bay seafront, a steep descent was required to reach it from the St Nicholas Cliff area of the town.

To give access to original "Spaw" and its mineral spring, the new Cliff Bridge Company was formed in 1826 to lease the Spa from the corporation to maximise its commercial potential by erecting an elegant iron footbridge to span the chasm of the valley from St Nicholas Cliff to the Spa.

By only the next year, it was completed, though despite its fast speed of construction, it came at a cost of around £7,000, double the original estimate. An opening ceremony was held on 19 July 1827, during which a mail coach was pulled by horses at high speed across the bridge. Much used, it soon became a toll bridge, with a booth erected at the St Nicholas Cliff end of the bridge. For regular users, season tickets were available allowing unlimited access to the bridge and Spa for one, two or four week periods.

In 1951, the Corporation of Scarborough purchased the bridge, removing the tolls and demolishing the toll booth.

Cliff Bridge is recorded in the National Heritage List for England as a Grade II listed building, having been designated on 22 December 1953. Grade II is the lowest of the three grades of listing, and is applied to "buildings that are nationally important and of special interest".

The bridge was closed to the public from November 2009 through to April 2010 for a £700,000 general renovation project, including new timber beams spanning the full width of the bridge, replacement of the main bridge deck and refurbishment and repainting of all metal components. The bridge refurbishment made North Yorkshire County Council one of three principal winners in the 2011 Historic Bridge and Infrastructure Awards.

References

Bridges in North Yorkshire
Bridges completed in 1827
1827 establishments in England
Grade II listed buildings in North Yorkshire
Grade II listed bridges
Buildings and structures in Scarborough, North Yorkshire
Pedestrian bridges in England